Martha Baillie (born 1960) is a Canadian poet and novelist.

Biography
Baillie was born in Toronto, Ontario. She studied history, French and Russian at the University of Edinburgh, and completed her studies at the Sorbonne, Paris and the University of Toronto. It was there that she became involved in theatre. In 1981, after an extended trip through Asia, she decided to shift her focus from acting to writing. After her return - and a brief interlude as a French immersion and ESL teacher - she took up a position at the Toronto Public Library where she is currently employed. Her writing has been published in Canada, Germany and Hungary.

Her most popular novel to date is The Shape I Gave You (2006), listed as a national bestseller by Maclean's magazine in May 2006.

In The Incident Report (2009), Baillie uses the format of 144 short reports to recount incidents from her own experiences as a librarian. As a work of fiction the novel contains conventional elements such as "a love story and a mystery"; as a report, it presents a subtext depicting "how Toronto libraries have become a refuge for the city's marginalized".The Incident Report was long listed for the 2009 Scotiabank Giller Prize.

Besides five novels, Baillie has had poems published in journals including Descant, Prairie Fire and The Antigonish Review. Other literary work includes a treatment on The Legacy of Joseph Wagenbach, an installation environment by Iris Häussler, first published in Brick in 2007.

The author lives in Toronto.

Selected works
 My Sister, Esther. Turnstone, Winnipeg 1995 
 Madame Balashovskaya's Apartment. Turnstone, Winnipeg 1999 
 The Shape I Gave You. Knopf Canada, 2006 
 The Incident Report. Pedlar Press, Toronto 2009 
 La disparition d'Heinrich Schlögel, roman. Trad. de l'anglais: Paule Noyât. Éditions Jacqueline Chambon, Arles 2017 ; Leméac, Montreal 2017  (A novel around Samuel Hearne). Shortlisted 2017 Governor General's Awards, Category Translation English-French

References

Sources

External links
 Martha Baillie's Website (includes book excerpts and other writing)
 My Sister, Esther, accessed 28 March 2009
 Madame Balashovskaya's Apartment, accessed 28 March 2009
 The Shape I gave You, accessed 28 March 2009
 The Incident Report, accessed 28 March 2009

1960 births
Living people
University of Paris alumni
20th-century Canadian novelists
21st-century Canadian novelists
20th-century Canadian poets
21st-century Canadian poets
Writers from Toronto
Canadian women poets
Canadian women novelists
University of Toronto alumni
Alumni of the University of Edinburgh
20th-century Canadian women writers
21st-century Canadian women writers
Canadian expatriates in Scotland
Canadian expatriates in France